Haiyang is a town under the administration of Xiuning County, Anhui, China. , it has five residential neighborhoods and 12 villages under its administration:
Neighborhoods
Hengjiang Community
Qining Community
Wanning Community
Luoning Community
Xinchengqu

Villages
Beijie Village
Nanjie Village
Xintang Village
Langsi Village
Chuanhu Village
Yanfu Village
Wanquan Village
Shiren Village
Chaikeng Village
Shou Village
Xiuyang Village
Wangjinqiao Village

References 

Township-level divisions of Anhui
Xiuning County